Donald Oscar Banks (25 October 19235 September 1980) was an Australian composer of concert, jazz, and commercial music.

Early life and education
Jazz was Banks' earliest and strongest musical influence. He learned the saxophone as a boy in Australia and was proficient enough to be invited to play in the Graeme Bell band, then one of the finest outside America. He served with the Australian Army Medical Corps between 1941 and 1946 and began to study piano, harmony and counterpoint privately. He attended the University of Melbourne Conservatorium of Music for two years before moving to Europe in 1950.

In the UK he studied composition privately with Mátyás Seiber, who was himself much interested in jazz, from 1950 to 1952. He became a friend and associate of Gunther Schuller and was much involved with Tubby Hayes, writing several compositions for him. There were also periods of study in Salzburg with modernist Milton Babbitt and in Florence with the serialist composer Luigi Dallapiccola.

Career
In the 1950s Banks was the secretary to Edward Clark, head of the London Contemporary Music Centre. He was chairman of the Society for the Promotion of New Music (SPNM) in 1967–68, and held several other posts in London whilst living in Purley, Surrey (at 16, Box Ridge Avenue). While in the UK during the 1960s his primary source of income came from scoring horror films produced by Hammer Studios, including Rasputin the Mad Monk, The Frozen Dead and The Mummy’s Shroud.

He returned to Australia in 1972, as Head of Composition and Electronic Music Studies at the Canberra School of Music. He remained there till 1977, then had a series of educational positions. In 1978 he was appointed Head of the School of Composition Studies at the New South Wales Conservatorium of Music. 

He died at his home in the Sydney suburb of McMahons Point, after an eight-year battle with chronic lymphocytic leukaemia. He left a widow, Valerie, and a son, Simon. The Don Banks Music Award, established in 1984, is funded by the Australia Council for the Arts.

Music
Banks's regarded his opus 1 as the Violin Sonata of 1953, though there are earlier works, such as the piano Sonatina and a trio, both 1948. The Five North Country Folk Songs, also from 1953, clearly show the influence of Mátyás Seiber.<ref>[http://www.musicweb-international.com/classrev/2022/Aug/Banks-chamber-TOCC0591.htm 'Don Banks: Vocal and Chamber Music'. Toccata Classics TOCC0591, reviewed at MusicWeb International]</ref> His best-known concert works include the Sonata da Camera for flute, clarinet, bass clarinet, piano, percussion, violin, viola, and cello (1961, dedicated to Seiber); a Horn Concerto (1965, dedicated to and premiered by Barry Tuckwell); a Trio for horn, violin, and piano (1962); a Violin Concerto (1968), and Nexus, his major 'third stream' composition.

Banks scored 19 feature films, 22 documentaries and more than 60 episodes of various television serials. Nearly half of his film scores were for Hammer Films. Composer Douglas Gamley said that Banks "was a twelve-tone/serial composer who revelled in the opportunity to write abrasive and highly dissonant scores in an idiom akin to that of the late Schoenberg." Randall Larson has said that The Reptile (1968) is perhaps his best Hammer score. Banks also composed jazz scores for Hammer, including Hysteria (1964). He also worked regularly with Halas & Batchelor on cartoon films, scoring more than 70 shorts, advertisements and animated television series.

Compositions

Orchestral worksFour Pieces for Orchestra (1953)
 Coney Island (1961)
 Elizabethan Miniatures (1962)
 Horn Concerto (1965)Assemblies (1966)
 Violin Concerto (1968)Intersections for Orchestra and Electronics (1969)Prospects (1973)Trilogy (1979)

Chamber and instrumental
 Sonatina in c minor for piano (1948)
 Trio for flute, violin and cello (1948)
 Sonata for violin and piano (1953)
 Three Studies for cello and piano (1954)
 Pezzo Dramatico (1956) (for pianist Margaret Kitchin)
 Sonata da Camera (1961)
 Trio for horn, violin and piano (1962) (for Barry Tuckwell)
 Prologue, Night Piece and Blues for Two for clarinet and piano (1968)
 String Quartet (1975)

Vocal
 Five North Country Folk Songs (1953) (for soprano Sophie Weisse)
 Tirade for mezzo-soprano and chamber ensemble (1968) (words, Peter Porter)

Third stream/crossover worksEquations I (1963) for jazz and chamber playersMeeting Place (1970) for jazz ensemble, symphony orchestra and synthesizerEquations II for jazz and chamber playersNexus (1971) for jazz quintet and symphony orchestra

Filmography
Banks is credited for composing music in the following films:The Price of Silence (1959)Murder at Site 3 (1959)The Third Alibi (1961)Captain Clegg (Night Creatures in U.S.) (1962)Panic (1963)The Punch and Judy Man (1963)The Evil of Frankenstein (1964)Crooks in Cloisters (1964)Nightmare (1964)Hysteria (1964)The Brigand of Kandahar (1965)Monster of Terror (Die, Monster, Die! in U.S.) (1965)The Reptile (1966)Rasputin the Mad Monk (1966)The Frozen Dead (1966)Torture Garden (1967)The Mummy's Shroud (1967)

References

Further reading
 Banks, Don (June 1970). "Converging Streams". The Musical Times 111, no. 1528: 596–599.
 Barkl, Michael. (1997). "Don Banks". The Oxford Companion to Australian Music, edited by Warren Bebbington. Melbourne: Oxford University Press.
 Covell, Roger (1967). Australia’s Music: Themes for a New Society. Melbourne: Sun Books.
 
 Mann, William (August 1968). "The Music of Don Banks". The Musical Times 109, no. 1506: 719–721.
 Sitsky, Larry (2011). Australian Chamber Music with Piano. Canberra: Australian National University E Press.  (pbk);  (ebook).
 Pressing, Jeff, John Whiteoak, and Roger T. Dean (2002). "Banks, Don(ald Oscar)". The New Grove Dictionary of Jazz'', second edition, edited by Barry Dean Kernfeld, 3 vols. London: Macmillan. .

External links

AMCOZ web profile 
Don Banks Music Award
Music Australia: source the National Library
History of British and Australian innovation, includes Don Banks ideas and equipment

1923 births
1980 deaths
20th-century classical composers
Australian classical composers
Australian film score composers
Australian male classical composers
Jazz-influenced classical composers
Male film score composers
Pupils of Luigi Dallapiccola
Third stream musicians
Twelve-tone and serial composers
University of Melbourne alumni
20th-century Australian male musicians
20th-century Australian musicians
Deaths from chronic lymphocytic leukemia
Deaths from cancer in New South Wales